Geneseo Community Unit School District 228, also known as Geneseo Schools, is a public school district serving Geneseo, Illinois.

Schools

Middle schools
Geneseo Middle School

High schools
Geneseo High School

Alternative programs
Rock River Cooperative Alternative School (grades 6–12)
ExCEL program (grades 6–12)

Elementary
Southwest
Millikin
Northside

References

External links
Geneseo Community Unit School District 228

Education in Henry County, Illinois
School districts in Illinois